In Euclidean geometry, Brahmagupta's formula is used to find the area of any cyclic quadrilateral (one that can be inscribed in a circle) given the lengths of the sides; its generalized version (Bretschneider's formula) can be used with non-cyclic quadrilateral.

Heron's formula can be thought as a sub-case of the Brahmagupta's formula.

Formula 

 

where , the semiperimeter, is defined to be

 

This formula generalizes Heron's formula for the area of a triangle. A triangle may be regarded as a quadrilateral with one side of length zero. From this perspective, as  approaches zero, a cyclic quadrilateral converges into a cyclic triangle (all triangles are cyclic), and Brahmagupta's formula simplifies to Heron's formula.

If the semiperimeter is not used, Brahmagupta's formula is

 

Another equivalent version is

Proof

Trigonometric proof
Here the notations in the figure to the right are used.

But since  is a cyclic quadrilateral, . Hence . Therefore,

(using the trigonometric identity).

Substituting this in the equation for the area,

The right-hand side is of the form  and hence can be written as

which, upon rearranging the terms in the square brackets, yields

that can be factored again into

Introducing the semiperimeter  yields

Taking the square root, we get

Non-trigonometric proof
An alternative, non-trigonometric proof utilizes two applications of Heron's triangle area formula on similar triangles.

Extension to non-cyclic quadrilaterals 
In the case of non-cyclic quadrilaterals, Brahmagupta's formula can be extended by considering the measures of two opposite angles of the quadrilateral:

 

where  is half the sum of any two opposite angles. Since , we have .) This more general formula is known as Bretschneider's formula.

It is a property of cyclic quadrilaterals (and ultimately of inscribed angles) that opposite angles of a quadrilateral sum to 180°.  Consequently, in the case of an inscribed quadrilateral,  is 90°, whence the term

giving the basic form of Brahmagupta's formula. It follows from the latter equation that the area of a cyclic quadrilateral is the maximum possible area for any quadrilateral with the given side lengths.

A related formula, which was proved by Coolidge, also gives the area of a general convex quadrilateral. It is

 

In a cyclic quadrilateral,  according to Ptolemy's theorem, and the formula of Coolidge reduces to Brahmagupta's formula.

Related theorems 
 Heron's formula for the area of a triangle is the special case obtained by taking .
 The relationship between the general and extended form of Brahmagupta's formula is similar to how the law of cosines extends the Pythagorean theorem.
 Increasingly complicated closed-form formulas exist for the area of general polygons on circles, as described by Maley et al.

References

External links

 A geometric proof from Sam Vandervelde.

Brahmagupta
Theorems about quadrilaterals and circles
Area